I Gymnasium Osijek is a high school in Osijek, Croatia.

History 

The school was established on 1 September 1992, when Assembly of Osijek Municipality reorganized Center for vocational education "Ribar Brothers".

From school year of 1991-92 till 1999-00 in school was realized part of program of general gymnasium for students of Franjo Kuhač Music School.

References

External links 
 Official website 

Education in Osijek
Gymnasiums in Croatia
Educational institutions established in 1992
1992 establishments in Croatia